Lenin Stadium was the common name of stadiums in the Soviet Union.

The stadiums formerly called the Lenin Stadium include:
Luzhniki Stadium in Moscow
Petrovsky Stadium in Saint Petersburg

The stadiums that still use this name include:
Lenin Stadium (Khabarovsk)